The 2017–18 St. John's Red Storm women's basketball team represented St. John's University during the 2017–18 NCAA Division I women's basketball season. The Red Storm, led by sixth-year head coach Joe Tartamella, played their games at Carnesecca Arena and were members of the Big East Conference. They finished the season 19–15, 9–9 in Big East play to finish in a tie for fifth place. They lost in the quarterfinals of the Big East women's basketball tournament to Creighton. They received an automatic bid to the Women's National Invitation Tournament where they defeated Marist, Penn and Duquesne in the first, second and third rounds before losing to West Virginia in the quarterfinals.

Roster

Schedule

|-
!colspan=9 style="background:#BA0C2F; color:#FFFFFF;"| Exhibition

|-
!colspan=9 style="background:#BA0C2F; color:#FFFFFF;"| Non-conference regular season

|-
!colspan=9 style="background:#BA0C2F; color:#FFFFFF;"| Big East regular season

|-
!colspan=9 style="background:#BA0C2F;"| Big East Women's Tournament

|-
!colspan=9 style="background:#BA0C2F;"| WNIT

See also
 2017–18 St. John's Red Storm men's basketball team

References

Saint John's
St. John's Red Storm women's basketball seasons
Saint John's
Saint John's
Saint John's